Neobrachelia is a genus of parasitic flies in the family Tachinidae. There are at least four described species in Neobrachelia.

Species
These four species belong to the genus Neobrachelia:
 Neobrachelia charapemyioides Townsend, 1931
 Neobrachelia edessae (Townsend, 1942)
 Neobrachelia grandis (Townsend, 1940)
 Neobrachelia mirabilis (Townsend, 1940)

References

Further reading

 
 
 
 

Tachinidae
Articles created by Qbugbot